Phrynidius inaequalis is a species of beetle in the family Cerambycidae. It was described by Say in 1835. It is known from Mexico and Honduras.

References

Apomecynini
Beetles described in 1835